Kadir Cin (born 7 May 1987) is a Turkish volleyball player. He plays for Arkas İzmir.

External links
Player profile at arkasspor.com

1987 births
Living people
Turkish men's volleyball players
Arkas Spor volleyball players
Ziraat Bankası volleyball players